The following is a list of pipeline accidents in the United States in 1993. It is one of several lists of U.S. pipeline accidents. See also: list of natural gas and oil production accidents in the United States.

Incidents 

This is not a complete list of all pipeline accidents. For natural gas alone, the Pipeline and Hazardous Materials Safety Administration (PHMSA), a United States Department of Transportation agency, has collected data on more than 3,200 accidents deemed serious or significant since 1987.

A "significant incident" results in any of the following consequences:
 Fatality or injury requiring in-patient hospitalization.
 $50,000 or more in total costs, measured in 1984 dollars.
 Liquid releases of five or more barrels (42 US gal/barrel).
 Releases resulting in an unintentional fire or explosion.

PHMSA and the National Transportation Safety Board (NTSB) post-incident data and results of investigations into accidents involving pipelines that carry a variety of products, including natural gas, oil, diesel fuel, gasoline, kerosene, jet fuel, carbon dioxide, and other substances. Occasionally pipelines are re-purposed to carry different products.

The following incidents occurred during 1993:
 1993 On March 28, a 36-inch Colonial Pipeline Company petroleum products pipeline ruptured near Herndon, Virginia. The rupture created a geyser which sprayed diesel fuel over  into the air, coating overhead power lines and adjacent trees, and mist covering adjacent Virginia Electric Power Company buildings. The diesel fuel spewed from the rupture into an adjacent storm water management pond and flowed overland and through a network of storm sewer pipes before reaching Sugarland Run Creek, a tributary of the Potomac River. The cause was latent third party damage. About 400,000 gallons of diesel were lost.
 1993 On April 6, a 16-inch crude oil pipeline ruptured, spilling up to 125,000 gallons of crude oil into a stream bed in Kern County, California, forcing a temporary closure of the nearby Golden State Freeway.
 1993 On May 21, a Sunoco pump station, in Creek County, Oklahoma, leaked about 29,000 gallons of petroleum.
 1993 A fire at a Transco/Williams Companies gas compressor station, in Billingsley, Alabama, on June 3 injured one worker. The cause was from equipment failure. 
 1993 On June 9, a cinder block duplex in Cliffwood Beach, New Jersey, exploded as a New Jersey Natural Gas Company (NJNG) contractor was trenching in front of the building. The gas explosion killed 3 residents of the duplex, and seriously injured 3 others.
 1993 On June 24, a Tennessee Gas Pipeline line failed just next to a gas compressor station in West Monroe, Louisiana, causing a massive fire that forced evacuations of homes & businesses within a mile of the failure. Internal corrosion of the pipeline was the cause.  
 1993 On July 22, a city of St. Paul Department of Public Works backhoe hooked and pulled apart a Northern States Power Company (NSP) high-pressure gas service line in St. Paul, Minnesota. An explosion and natural gas-fueled fire resulted about 20 minutes after the backhoe hooked the service line. The explosion force caused part of the building to land on and flatten an automobile traveling southwest on East Third Street, and the driver died instantly. The explosion and ensuing fire also killed an apartment occupant and a person outside the building and injured 12 people.
 1993 On July 26, a 6-inch pipeline in Nebraska was exposed by scour in a creek bed and its banks, and was struck by flood debris, which caused it to rupture.
 1993 On August 1, a Koch Industries butane pipeline ruptured in Creek County, Oklahoma, forcing about 50 people to evacuate their homes.
 1993 On August 14, a 12 inch gas pipeline failed in Union, New York, causing a fireball that destroyed a nearby home. There were no injuries.
 1993 An ammonia pipeline failed in Sperry, Oklahoma on August 20. 80 homes in the area were evacuated. Several people were treated for ammonia inhalation injuries.
 1993 A trencher being used in golf course construction hit a petroleum productions pipeline in Berwick Township, Pennsylvania on September 2, causing a leak of about 26,250 gallons of gasoline. There were no injuries.
 1993 On September 15, an 8-inch NORCO Pipeline Co. line ruptured in east Indiana, just west of Edgerton, Ohio, spilling about 30,000 gallons of diesel fuel. There was a 4 foot long rupture in the pipeline, and some of the diesel entered Fish Creek, killing wildlife. The rupture was caused by pumping against a closed valve. Later, NORCO and ARCO agreed to pay $2.8 million for the spill in US District Court.
 1993 On November 3, Amoco Pipeline was fined $12,500 for a 1971 pipeline leak that contaminated a drinking well and caused other pollution problems for people living near Garfield, Minnesota.
 1993 On November 30, a building in Truckee, California exploded from a failure in a propane distribution system. 1 person was killed, 8 more were injured, and, over $50,000 of damage was done. 
 1993 On December 2, a 10-inch Conoco pipeline ruptured, spilling  of gasoline into a creek in Washington, Missouri.
 1993 On December 8, a Sunoco pipeline was detected to be leaking by pressure loss, but, it took several days to find the leak point in Upper Leacock Township, Lancaster County, Pennsylvania. About 2,369 barrels of transmix were lost. The cause was from a backhoe hitting the pipeline in a cornfield.
 1993 An explosion and fire on a gas transmission pipeline on December 20, near Mellen, Wisconsin, cut off the gas supply to 3,500 customers in the area.
 1993 In Ventura County, California, on December 22, a leak occurred from a crude oil pipeline. This spill released an estimated 92,000 gallons of crude oil. The oil flowed through a culvert, traveled through 150 feet of woodland and brush, to McGrath Creek, then flowed another 1,200 feet into McGrath Lake.

References

Lists of pipeline accidents in the United States